The 2022 Sporting Kansas City season will be the 27th season of the team's existence in Major League Soccer and the 12th year played under the Sporting Kansas City moniker.

Player movement

In 

Per Major League Soccer and club policies terms of the deals do not get disclosed.

Draft picks 
Draft picks are not automatically signed to the team roster. Only trades involving draft picks and executed after the start of 2022 MLS SuperDraft will be listed in the notes.

Out

Non-competitive

Preseason exhibitions

Competitive

MLS

Standings

Western Conference

Overall table

Match results

February

March

April

May

June

July

August

September

October

MLS Cup Playoffs

U.S. Open Cup

References

Sporting Kansas City seasons
Sporting
Sporting Kansas City
Sporting Kansas